Dana Ghia (born Felicita Ghia; 13 July 1932) is an Italian former actress, singer and model. During her acting career, Ghia was sometimes credited as Ghia Arlen.

Life and career
Born Felicita Ghia in Milan, Ghia started her career as a runway model. She debuted as a singer in 1953, during a student show, then in 1956 she was first noted thanks to the participation on the RAI contest for newcomers Primo applauso. Shorty later Ghia started appearing as a vocalist in several RAI variety shows, and recording several singles. Between 1963 and 1977 she appeared in a number of films and TV-series, mainly in character roles.

Selected filmography 

 Degueyo (1966)
 4 Dollars of Revenge (1966)
 The Dirty Outlaws (1967)
 Today We Kill... Tomorrow We Die! (1968)
 Police Chief Pepe (1969)
 Burn! (1969) as Francesca
 Normal Young Man (1970)
 The Priest's Wife (1971)
 Trinity Is Still My Name (1971)
 The Bloodstained Butterfly (1971)
 My Dear Killer (1972)
 Smile Before Death (1972)
 Seven Deaths in the Cat's Eye (1973)
 La svergognata (1974)
 Free Hand for a Tough Cop (1975)
 So Young, So Lovely, So Vicious... (1975)
 The Cursed Medallion (1975)
 California (1977)
 Nine Guests for a Crime (1977)

Selected discography 

Singles
 
     1958:  (Vis Radio, Vi MQN 36130)
     1958:  (Vis Radio, Vi MQN 36131)
     1958:  (Vis Radio, Vi MQN 36164)
     1958:  (Vis Radio, Vi MQN 36165)
     1958:  (Vis Radio, Vi MQN 36312)
     1958:  (Vis Radio, Vi MQN 36313)
     1958:  (Vis Radio, Vi MQN 36317)
     1958:  (Vis Radio, Vi MQN 36318)
     1959: The Hula Hoop song/Till (Vis Radio, Vi MQN 36322)
     1959:  (con Tony Cucchiara) (Vis Radio, Vi MQN 36335)
     1959:  (Vis Radio, Vi MQN 36339)
     1959:  (Vis Radio, Vi MQN 36476)
     1959:  (Vis Radio, Vi MQN 36477)

EP
 
     1958: The Hula Hoop song/Till/ (Vis Radio, Vi MQ 14149)
     1959:  (Vis Radio, Vi MQ 14169)

References

External links 
 

Italian film actresses
Italian television actresses
Italian women singers
1932 births
Actresses from Milan
Living people
Italian female models
Italian pop singers